Nikolay Yermakov (3 January 1910 – 1982) was a Soviet sailor. He competed in the 6 Metre event at the 1952 Summer Olympics.

References

External links
 

1910 births
1982 deaths
Soviet male sailors (sport)
Olympic sailors of the Soviet Union
Sailors at the 1952 Summer Olympics – 6 Metre